Nathaniel Levi "Nat" Brown (born 15 June 1981) is an English professional footballer who plays as a defender for Brighouse Town.

He has previously played for Huddersfield Town, Wrexham, Macclesfield Town, and Lincoln City.

Career
Born in Sheffield, Brown worked his way through the ranks at Huddersfield Town before settling down and making over 80 appearances for them without scoring a goal. Although he was very much a fan favourite, with "Nat Brown for England" heard ringing round any stadium he frequented.

Was well known around Lincolnshire with the local football clubs, whenever a ball was booted into the air the words hoof nat brown were shouted.

Brown is a very versatile player can play in central defence or as a striker. He has, however, also played in the central midfield role, whilst playing under former Lincoln boss, Keith Alexander.

After being released by Huddersfield, Brown was approached by several clubs, however, he opted to sign for Lincoln City. He featured heavily in Lincoln's unsuccessful Play-off drive in the 2005/06 season, putting in some impressive performances. In 2006/07 he initially found it hard settling into the squad as he initially picked up an injury, and due to the relatively impressive performances of the current first team squad, his chances of breaking into a regular spot were limited. Since, however, due to him coming back into fitness and other squad members falling ill of suspension and injury, he has proven himself once again and now finds himself a regular once more. On 26 June 2008, Brown left Lincoln after having his contract cancelled by mutual consent. He joined Wrexham in the Conference National a day later.

On 6 November 2008 he joined league two side Macclesfield Town on a month's loan linking up with his one-time Lincoln City manager Keith Alexander. He found himself something of a goalscoring touch, by scoring in his first three league games. On 1 January 2009 it was announced that Nat had signed a loan deal until the end of the season due to the good performances he had been putting in for Macclesfield Town. This move was made permanent in July 2009, when he signed a 2-year deal with the Silkmen. In May 2010 he put paper on a new two-year deal with the club, keeping him at Moss Rose until the summer of 2012.

In July 2010, he was appointed as Macclesfield's vice captain to Paul Morgan. On 1 February 2013 Brown re-joined Lincoln City on loan until the end of the 2012–13 season, linking him back up with The Imps new boss Gary Simpson who had previously managed Brown at Macclesfield after an initially being Lincoln's assistant manager in his first spell at Sincil Bank. On 3 June 2013 Brown signed a one-year contract with Lincoln.

Honours
Huddersfield Town
 Football League Third Division
 Play-off Winners: 2003/04

References

External links

1981 births
Living people
Footballers from Sheffield
English footballers
Association football defenders
Huddersfield Town A.F.C. players
Lincoln City F.C. players
Wrexham A.F.C. players
Macclesfield Town F.C. players
FC Halifax Town players
Harrogate Town A.F.C. players
Boston United F.C. players
English Football League players
National League (English football) players
Black British sportspeople